Members of the New South Wales Legislative Assembly who served in the 54th parliament held their seats from 2007 to 2011. They were elected at the 2007 state election, and at by-elections. The Speaker was Richard Torbay.

See also
Second Iemma ministry
Rees ministry
Keneally ministry
Results of the 2007 New South Wales state election (Legislative Assembly)
Candidates of the 2007 New South Wales state election

References

Members of New South Wales parliaments by term
20th-century Australian politicians